Corey Harris (born February 21, 1969, in Denver, Colorado, United States) is an American  blues and reggae musician, currently residing in Charlottesville, Virginia. Along with Keb' Mo' and Alvin Youngblood Hart, he raised the flag of acoustic guitar blues in the mid-1990s. He was featured on the 2003 PBS television mini-series, The Blues, in an episode directed by Martin Scorsese.

Biography
Harris was born and raised near Denver, Colorado. He graduated from Bates College in Lewiston, Maine with a bachelor's degree in 1991, and was awarded an honorary doctorate in 2007. Harris received a Thomas J. Watson Fellowship for language studies in Cameroon in his early twenties, before taking a teaching post in Napoleonville, Louisiana under the Teach For America program. His debut solo album Between Midnight and Day (1995) was produced by Grammy nominee/composer/producer Larry Hoffman, who discovered him in 1994 in Helena, Arkansas.  The record included covers of Sleepy John Estes, Fred McDowell, Charlie Patton, Muddy Waters, and Booker White. His second recording with Hoffman, Fish Ain't Bitin''', was the recipient of the 1997 W.C. Handy Award for Best Acoustic Blues Album of the Year. Recorded in New Orleans, it featured Harris' original songs, vocal, and guitar backed on certain tracks by a trio of tuba and two trombones arranged by producer Hoffman.  In 2002, Harris collaborated with Ali Farka Toure on his album Mississippi to Mali, fusing blues and Toure's music from northern Mali. In 2003, he contributed to the Northern Blues release Johnny's Blues: A Tribute To Johnny Cash.

Harris has lived and traveled widely in West Africa, an influence that has permeated much of his work. Harris has toured extensively throughout Europe, Canada, West Africa, Japan and Australia. He is known for his solo acoustic work as well as his electric band, formerly known as the '5 x 5', now known as The Corey Harris Band.  He helped Billy Bragg and Wilco to write the music for "Hoodoo Voodoo" on Mermaid Avenue, an album consisting entirely of songs for which the lyrics were written by Woody Guthrie. He also appeared as a musician and vocalist on the album and its sequels, Mermaid Avenue Vol. II and Mermaid Avenue Vol. III.

In September 2007, The John D. and Catherine T. MacArthur Foundation announced that Harris was among 24 people named MacArthur Fellows for 2007. The Fellowship, worth $500,000, is payable over five years.

Discography
Solo
1995: Between Midnight and Day (Alligator)
1997: Fish Ain't Bitin' (Alligator)
1999: Greens from the Garden (Alligator)
2000: Vu-Du Menz (Alligator)
2001: Live at Starr Hill 1/27/01 (Njumba)
2002: Downhome Sophisticate (Rounder)
2003: Mississippi to Mali (Rounder)
2005: Daily Bread (Rounder)
2007: Zion Crossroads (Telarc)
2009: blu.black (Telarc)
2011: Father Sun Mother Earth (Njumba)
2012: Motherless Child (with Lutan Fyah)2013: Fulton Blues 
2013: Rasta Blues Experience Live2014: Fulton Blues (Deluxe Edition)2015: Live! from Turtle Island 
2016 Live in Vienna2018 Free Water Way 
2019 Louisa County BluesContributions to others
1998: Mermaid Avenue2000: Mermaid Avenue Vol. II2003: Johnny's Blues: A Tribute To Johnny Cash (Northern Blues)
2005: Come to the Mountain: Old Time Music for Modern Times2012: Mermaid Avenue Vol. III, issued as part of Mermaid Avenue: The Complete Sessions''

References

External links

  Official website
 [ Corey Harris] at Allmusic
 Speech by Corey Harris at Bates College

1969 births
Living people
African-American guitarists
American blues singers
American blues guitarists
American male guitarists
Bates College alumni
Musicians from Charlottesville, Virginia
Slide guitarists
Watson Fellows
MacArthur Fellows
Singers from Denver
Guitarists from Colorado
20th-century American guitarists
Teach For America alumni
20th-century African-American male singers
21st-century African-American male singers